Żywiecki is a Polish surname. Notable people with the surname include:

Aleksander Żywiecki (born 1962), Polish painter
Alexis Zywiecki (born 1984), French footballer

See also
Zywicki

Polish-language surnames